Brymbo Victoria F.C. were a Welsh football club based in Brymbo, Wales. They started the 2021–22 season as members of the North East Wales Football League Premier Division before resigning from the league in August 2021 and dissolving the club.

History
For a full history see; List of football seasons involving Brymbo teams

Formed sometime around 1900 Brymbo Victoria were runners up in the Welsh Amateur Cup in 1908. They joined The Combination midway through the 1909/10 season, taking on the results of Birkenhead who had resigned mid season, finishing bottom of the league. Upon joining The Combination their colours were reported as being red and white. The 1910–11 season saw an upturn in fortunes and they finished fourth. However they folded at the end of the season. The name returned in 2017, over 100 years since the previous club last played.

Seasons

Cup History

Honours

League
Wrexham and District League Division 1
Winners : 1903, 1904, 1906
Runners-up : 1905
North East Wales League
Runners-up : 2020

Cups
Welsh Amateur Cup
Runners-up : 1908

St Martins Charity Cup
Winners : 1908

Flintshire League Challenge Cup
Runners Up : 1907

Resurrection
The Brymbo Victoria name was resurrected more than 100 years after they last played, when in June 2017 the name was listed among the entrants for the 2017–18 North East Wales League season. This was following the decision of Brymbo Sports and Social Club to switch to Saturday football, following the demise of the Wrexham Sunday League.

Other Info

Not to be confused with Brymbo Institute, Brymbo Steelworks FC or Brymbo FC.

References

Sport in Wrexham
Football clubs in Wrexham
Sport in Wrexham County Borough
The Combination
Welsh football clubs in English leagues
1900s establishments in Wales
1911 disestablishments in Wales
2017 establishments in Wales
2021 disestablishments in Wales
North East Wales Football League clubs
Association football clubs established in the 1900s
Association football clubs disestablished in 1911
Association football clubs established in 2017
Association football clubs disestablished in 2021
Defunct football clubs in Wales
Clwyd East Football League clubs